The Elon Phoenix football program is the intercollegiate American football team for the Elon University located in the U.S. state of North Carolina. The school first fielded a football team in 1909 and currently competes in the NCAA Division I Football Championship Subdivision (FCS). After 11 seasons in the Southern Conference, Elon joined the Colonial Athletic Association for all sports, including football, in 2014. The Phoenix play their home games at the 13,100 seat Rhodes Stadium.

History

Classifications
1991–1998: NCAA Division II
1999–present: NCAA Division I–AA/FCS

Conference affiliations 
 Independent (1909–31)
 Conference Carolinas (1932–74)
 South Atlantic Conference (1975–96)
 NCAA Division II Independent (1997–98)
 NCAA Division I-AA Independent (1999–2001)
 Big South Conference (2002)
 Southern Conference (2003–13)
 Colonial Athletic Association (2014–present)

Playoff appearances

NCAA Division I-AA/FCS 
The Phoenix have appeared in the FCS Playoffs four times. Their record combined is 0–4.

NAIA 
The Phoenix, then known as the Fighting Christians, appeared in the NAIA playoffs six times. Their combined record was 10–4.

Championships

National

Conference

Notable former players
Notable alumni include:
 Jack Boone
 Hal Bradley
 Shane Gillis
 Joey Hackett
 Terrell Hudgins
 Dwayne Ijames
 Rich McGeorge
 Cameron McGlenn
 Aaron Mellette
 Chad Nkang
 Tony Settles
 Jimmy Smith
 Joe West
 Brandon Ward
 Oli Udoh

References

External links

 
American football teams established in 1909
1909 establishments in North Carolina